Belford Historic District is a historic district listed on the National Register of Historic Places in Georgetown, Texas. It comprises an eight-block area roughly bounded by University Avenue, the rear property lines to the east of Main Street, 19th Street, and the rear property lines to the west of Austin Street.

The district contains a high concentration of mostly early twentieth-century dwellings built by prominent local lumberman Charles S. Belford. Of the 81 structures within the district's confines, 70 are classified as contributing and add to the historic character of the area. The district provides a cross-section of Belford's career in the construction business, and a wide variety of styles and types of residences can be found, such as L- and modified L-plan houses, small bungalows, Prairie-style homes, and Belford's own Queen Anne residence. The neighborhood has long been an area where many of Georgetown's leading citizens, such as former mayor Marsh F. Smith and Judge Cooper Sansom, have lived.

See also

 National Register of Historic Places listings in Williamson County, Texas
 Williamson County Courthouse Historic District

References

External links
 

Geography of Williamson County, Texas
Georgetown, Texas
Historic districts on the National Register of Historic Places in Texas
National Register of Historic Places in Williamson County, Texas